Everything That Rises Must Converge is a collection of short stories written by Flannery O'Connor during the final decade of her life. The collection's eponymous story derives its name from the work of Pierre Teilhard de Chardin. The collection was published posthumously in 1965 and contains an introduction by Robert Fitzgerald. Of the volume's nine stories, seven had been printed in magazines or literary journals prior to being collected, including three that won O. Henry Awards: "Greenleaf" (1957), "Everything That Rises Must Converge" (1963), and "Revelation" (1965). "Judgment Day" is a dramatically reworked version of "The Geranium", which was one of O'Connor's earliest publications and appeared in her graduate thesis at the University of Iowa. "Parker's Back", the collection's only completely new story, was a last-minute addition.

Short story contents 
"Everything That Rises Must Converge"
"Greenleaf"
"A View of the Woods"
"The Enduring Chill"
"The Comforts of Home"
"The Lame Shall Enter First"
"Revelation"
"Parker's Back"
"Judgement Day"

"Everything That Rises Must Converge" 

The short story that lends its name to the 1965 short story collection was first published in the 1961 issue of New World Writing.  The story won O'Connor her second O. Henry Award in 1963.  The story's protagonist is a recent college graduate and aspiring writer named Julian who lives with his mother in an unnamed Southern city. Julian's mother attends a weekly exercise session at the local YMCA but is wary of riding the bus by herself after the recent racial integration of the city's  transportation system. Though he despises his mother's racism, snobbery and anti-intellectualism, Julian reluctantly escorts her on the bus  out of a sense of filial duty. One night, after his mother loudly complains to the other white passengers about the state of affairs under integration, Julian makes a point of sitting next to a black man on the bus, who ignores him in spite of Julian's attempt to be friendly. Soon a black woman and her young son named Carver board as well. Julian's mother shows an affection for Carver in spite of his mother's disapproval and gives him a penny when they all disembark at the same station, causing Carver's mother to assault her on the sidewalk. Julian is unsympathetic at first and tells his mother that she has received what she deserved, but he soon realizes the extent to which his mother has been affected by the incident.

The title "Everything That Rises Must Converge" refers to a work by the French philosopher Pierre Teilhard de Chardin titled the "Omega Point":  "Remain true to yourself, but move ever upward toward greater consciousness and greater love!  At the summit you will find yourselves united with all those who, from every direction, have made the same ascent.  For everything that rises must converge."

In popular culture

In the fifth season Lost episode, "The Incident", Jacob reads Everything That Rises Must Converge while waiting for John Locke to fall from a window.

The band Shriekback put out a song by this title in 1985.

The music duo The Handsome Family released a song by this title in 1995.

A song by Moby is named “Everything That Rises.”

The band A Hope for Home put out a song by this title in 2011.

The band Elephant Tree (band) included the title in the lyrics for their song 'Bird'

In the Æon Flux episode "Chronophasia", a character speaks the title of the story.

References

External links
 

1965 short story collections
Short story collections by Flannery O'Connor
Short stories by Flannery O'Connor
Books published posthumously
Farrar, Straus and Giroux books